Metal Slug Anthology is a video game compilation for the PlayStation 2, PlayStation Portable, PC and the Wii. The Wii version boasts different controller configurations, most taking advantage of the Wii Remote, with the Japanese version supporting the Classic Controller and all regional variants supporting the GameCube controller. The game also marks the return of SNK Playmore as a third-party developer for a Nintendo console since the SNES era.

The graphics are virtually the same as the original versions released on arcade (and the more recent titles published on PS2 and Xbox). The only major change is that all games now display at a converted 480i resolution (compared to the standard 240p). Cooperative gameplay is enabled on the console versions of the game, while the PSP version has a wireless mode so that two people can play together and work as a team.

A downloadable version was made available on the PlayStation Store for PSP on October 1, 2009. The Metal Slug Anthology was then released on PC in 2009 under the name Metal Slug Collection PC. However, this version offers less content and an alternative menu interface. It was also released on PlayStation Store for PlayStation 3 and PlayStation 4 in 2015 and 2016 respectively.

Included titles
Metal Slug
Metal Slug 2
Metal Slug X
Metal Slug 3
Metal Slug 4
Metal Slug 5
Metal Slug 6

Metal Slug 1-5 and X are done via emulation of the Neo Geo AES versions, while 6 is a ported version of the arcade game.

Included features
Metal Slug 1-6 and X are included in the release, and the games have not been altered in any way. This is the same with the characters and abilities, which have all been kept the same, but the game's manual erroneously states that the 'slide' ability is achievable in Metal Slug 4, 5, and 6 — Metal Slug 4 and 6 do not include this feature in either the arcade or console version.

Extra features
The game includes several special features:
 Art Gallery - Concept art of Metal Slug 1 to 6. 
 Wallpapers - PSP-only option. A collection of wallpapers that can be copied to the Memory Stick.
 Sound Gallery - Music from Metal Slug 1 to 6. The PSP version includes an option that allows the player to copy the music to the Memory Stick as Atrac3+ format audio files with the proper track name and album tags. 
 Game Options - Including difficulty, lives (which can be limited or unlimited, if they are limited the amount of lives the player has depends upon the difficulty) and a rapid-fire option for all games except Metal Slug 6.
 Interview - A readable interview with some of the games' designers and programmers about the Metal Slug series itself.

Reception

The Metal Slug Anthology received positive reviews, but was criticized for its lack of Classic Controller support on the Wii version's Western releases.

Notes

References

External links
Japanese Official Site of Metal Slug Complete
IGN: Metal Slug Anthology Preview (PSP)
IGN: SNK Slugs Wii
Metal Slug: Anthology at MobyGames

2006 video games
Anthology
PlayStation 2 games
PlayStation 3 games
PlayStation 4 games
PlayStation Network games
PlayStation Portable games
Run and gun games
SNK game compilations
Wii games
Video games developed in the United States
Video games featuring female protagonists
Video games with commentaries
Multiplayer and single-player video games
Cooperative video games
Terminal Reality games

sv:Metal Slug Anthology